Emory Stephen Bogardus (born near Belvidere, Illinois, February 21, 1882 – August 21, 1973) was a prominent figure in the history of American sociology. Bogardus founded one of the first sociology departments at an American university, at the University of Southern California in 1915.

Education and career
Bogardus received his bachelor's and master's degrees at Northwestern University in 1908 and 1909, respectively.  He received a Ph.D. from the University of Chicago in 1911.

Immediately after earning his doctorate, Bogardus joined the faculty of the University of Southern California as a professor of sociology, helping to establish an independent sociology department there in 1915. He also developed a sociological principle known as the Bogardus Social Distance Scale.

”He conducted pioneer studies of Mexican immigration [to the United States], labor, education and settlement patterns in the Southwest” in the early 20th century.

Extracurricular activities
In addition to his work in the field, Bogardus also engaged in many activities designed to strengthen the discipline of sociology through social organizations. In 1920, he founded Alpha Kappa Delta, the international sociology honor society and was national president of that organization from 1924–1925, 1926–1927, and 1946–1947. In 1929, he co-founded the Pacific Sociological Association. In 1931, he served as president of the American Sociological Society. He is one of the honorees of the California Social Work Hall of Distinction.

Publications
During his lengthy academic career, Bogardus authored 24 books and over 250 articles of varying lengths. His books are as follows (multiple dates indicate various editions):
Introduction to the Social Sciences, 1913, 1922
Introduction to Sociology, 1913, 1927, 1931, 1949
Essentials of Social Psychology, 1917, 1923
A History of Social Thought, 1922,1929
The New Social Research, 1923, 1927
Fundamentals of Social Psychology, 1924, 1941
Social Problems and Social Processes, edited, 1933
Contemporary Sociology, 1931; Leaders and Leadership, 1934
Essentials of Americanization, 1919,1923
Immigration and Race Attitudes, 1928
The Mexican in the United States, 1934
The City Boy and His Problems, 1926
Introduction to Social Research, 1936
The Development of Social Thought, 1940, 1947
Principles of Cooperation, 1952, 1964

He was also the founder of The Journal of Sociology and Social Research, which he edited for 45 years.

References

External links

University of Southern California tribute to Emory S. Bogardus
California Social Work Hall of Distinction bio of Bogardus

1882 births
1973 deaths
American sociologists
Presidents of the American Sociological Association
Northwestern University alumni
University of Chicago alumni
University of Southern California faculty